Edmund John Baillie (4 May 1851 – 18 October 1897) was a Welsh businessman, horticulturalist and vegetarianism activist.

Biography

Baillie was born in Hawarden on 4 May 1851. As a young man, Baillie worked at the firm F. and A. Dickson and Sons of Eastgate, Chester where he eventually became its adviser and partner. On the amalgamation of Dickson's two firms, he became deputy Chairman of Dicksons, Limited.

Baillie was a friend of John Ruskin and was President of the John Ruskin Society in Liverpool. He was honorary secretary and treasurer of the Grosvenor Museum at Chester and a member of the Chester Society of Natural Science. He was a member of the Royal Horticultural Society. He was elected for the Linnean Society of London on 21 June 1878 and became a Fellow in 1883. He specialized in fruit trees. Baillie corresponded with Walt Whitman.

He contributed to the Gardener's Magazine, Journal of Botany, Journal of Horticulture, Cottage Gardener and the Proceedings of the Linnean Society. For his services to natural science he was awarded the Kingsley Memorial Medal. Baillie was a Presbyterian and was church secretary at the English Presbyterian Church of Wales, Chester for many years. He was a spiritualist and member of the London Spiritualist Alliance.

He died on 18 October 1897 in Chester.

Vegetarianism

Baillie was a vegetarian. He joined the Vegetarian Society in 1878 and later served as a Vice-President. Baillie authored papers in defence of vegetarianism that were read at conferences such as the International Vegetarian Congress.

Selected publications

John Ruskin: Aspects of His Thought and Teachings (1882)
The Importance of British Fruit Growing From a Food Point of View (1896)

References

1851 births
1897 deaths
People from Hawarden
19th-century Welsh businesspeople
Fellows of the Linnean Society of London
People associated with the Vegetarian Society
Vegetarianism activists
Welsh horticulturists
Welsh spiritualists